Hendrik Christiaan "Henk" de Looper (26 December 1912 in Hilversum – 2 January 2006 in Hilversum) was a Dutch field hockey player who competed in the 1936 Summer Olympics.

He was a member of the Dutch field hockey team, which won the bronze medal. He played all five matches as halfback.

His younger brother Jan de Looper was his teammate.

External links
 
profile

1912 births
2006 deaths
Dutch male field hockey players
Olympic field hockey players of the Netherlands
Field hockey players at the 1936 Summer Olympics
Olympic bronze medalists for the Netherlands
Sportspeople from Hilversum
Olympic medalists in field hockey
Medalists at the 1936 Summer Olympics
20th-century Dutch people
21st-century Dutch people